The Saint Meets the Tiger is the title of a crime thriller produced by the British unit of RKO Pictures, produced in 1941, but not released until 1943. This was to be the last of the eight films in RKO's film series about the crimefighter the Saint.

After The Saint's Vacation (1941), Hugh Sinclair makes his second (and final) appearance as Templar in this adventure, which sees Templar investigating a dead body left on his doorstep. This leads him to a quiet seaside village in Cornwall where he pursues a mysterious villain known as The Tiger. Co-starring in the film is Jean Gillie as Templar's love interest, Patricia Holm. Although this character made many appearances in the book series, this is to date the only film in which she appears. The character next appears on screen portrayed by Eliza Dushku in an unaired pilot for a Saint TV series produced in the 2010s.

Because of a dispute between RKO and the Saint's creator, Leslie Charteris, the film was put on hold after shooting finished in June 1941. The reason for the dispute was that RKO was about to release The Gay Falcon in October 1941, the first film in their new Falcon series, and Leslie Charteris felt that the Falcon was nothing but a copy of his character, enhanced by the fact that George Sanders played the Falcon. He was the most established face of the Saint, after having played the character in five of the previous films, the last being released earlier the same year. RKO eventually sold the US distribution rights to Republic Pictures, while its British arm handled the UK distribution as planned, and the film was released in both countries in 1943.

The Saint Meets the Tiger is an adaptation of Charteris' first Saint novel, Meet - The Tiger!, and was the last Saint novel adapted by the RKO series. In a sense, it was also the last film in the RKO series, as the final film, The Saint's Return did not come until ten years later and was produced and distributed in the UK by British Hammer Films, while RKO only handled the US distribution.

Plot summary

Simon "The Saint" Templar finds a dead man on his doorstep. Soon the ace investigator finds himself mired in more murder, smuggling and a South American mine.

Cast
 Hugh Sinclair as Simon Templar (The Saint)
 Jean Gillie as Pat Holm
 Gordon McLeod as Insp. Claud Teal / Prof. Karn
 Clifford Evans as Tidemarsh / The Tiger
 Wylie Watson as Horace (Templar's butler)
 Dennis Arundell as Lionel Bentley
 Charles Victor as Bittle
 Louise Hampton as Aunt Agatha Gurten
 John Salew as Merridon (curator of the Baycome Museum)
 Arthur Hambling as Police constable
 Amy Veness as Mrs. Donald Jones
 Claude Bailey as Donald Jones
 Noel Dainton as Burton (Bentley's butler)
 Eric Clavering as Frankie
 Ben Williams as Joe Gallo
 Joan Hickson as Mary (Aunt Agatha's maid)
 John Slater as Eddie
 Tony Quinn as Paddy
 Alf Goddard as Tailor

References

External links
 
 
 

1943 films
The Saint (Simon Templar)
British black-and-white films
Films directed by Paul L. Stein
British crime films
1943 crime films
Films based on British novels
British detective films
Republic Pictures films
1940s British films